The Ferrari F50 (Type F130) is a mid-engine sports car manufactured by Italian automobile manufacturer Ferrari from 1995 until 1997. Introduced in 1995, the car is a two-door, two seat targa top. The car is powered by a 4.7 L naturally aspirated Tipo F130B 60-valve V12 engine that was developed from the 3.5 L V12 used in the 1990 Ferrari 641 Formula One car. The car's design is an evolution of the 1989 Ferrari Mythos concept car.

A total of 349 cars were made, with the last car rolling off the production line in July 1997.

The F50's engine predated the car; it was used in the Ferrari 333 SP for the American IMSA GT Championship in 1994, allowing it to become eligible for the stock engine World Sports Car category.

Racing

Following the motorsport theme of the Ferrari F40 LM, Ferrari developed the F50 based F50 GT in collaboration with its racing partners Dallara and Michelotto to compete in GT1-class racing. Notable changes made to the car include a fixed roof, a large rear spoiler, new front spoiler, adjustable suspension system, Speedline racing alloy wheels with racing slicks and a large rear diffuser. A test held in 1996 proved the car to be quicker even than the 333SP, but this went unnoticed as Ferrari cancelled the F50 GT project due to entry of purpose built racing cars in competition such as the Porsche 911 GT1 and due to lack of funding, instead focusing on Formula One after the BPR Global GT Series folded. Ferrari sold off the three complete chassis that were built – the test car 001, 002 and 003. Chassis 002 and 003 had bodies fitted before being sold. The remaining three tubs were reportedly destroyed.

Specifications

General
Manufactured in: Maranello, Italy
Number produced: 349 (1995 until July 1997)
Inspiration: 1990 Ferrari 641 as driven by Alain Prost

Dimensions

Distribution: 42%/58% (front/rear)
Length: 
Height: 
Width: 
Wheelbase: 
Front track: 
Rear track:

Engine

Type: Tipo 036-derived, model SFE 4.7 VJGAEA, Tipo F130 B
Position: Rear mid-engine, rear-wheel-drive layout
Configuration: Longitudinally-mounted 65° V12
Aspiration: Naturally aspirated, with variable-length intake manifold via butterfly valve in intake manifold
Intake manifold: carbon fibre reinforced polymer
Block: Modular cast iron
Heads/Pistons: light-alloy aluminum heads/forged Mahle pistons
Oil sump: aluminium
Connecting rods: forged titanium
Crankshaft: forged steel
Cam covers/Oil and water pump housing: magnesium sand castings
Exhaust manifold: stainless steel
Engine weight: 
Valvetrain: 5 valves per cylinder (3 intake, 2 exhaust), 60-valves (total) DOHC per cylinder bank driven by low-noise Morse chain
Displacement: 
Max. power:  at 8,000 rpm
Max. torque:  at 6,500 rpm
Specific output.: /litre
Weight/Power ratio: 2.69 kg/PS
Bore X Stroke: 
Bore:Stroke ratio: 1.23:1 (oversquare)
Compression ratio: 11.3:1
Redline: 8,500 rpm
Fuel cutoff: 8,640 rpm
Fuel feed: Bosch Motronic 2.7 sequential injection and Electronic control unit (controls the fuel feed, ignition timing, and variable length intake and exhaust systems)
Ignition system: Bosch static electronic distributor-less ignition
Lubrication: dry sump, tank incorporated within the final drive housing, 3 scavenger pumps
Variable intake: butterfly valve in carbon fibre intake manifold closed at low rpm, open at high rpm
Variable exhaust: butterfly valve in upper tailpipes closed at low rpm, open at high rpm
Fuel tank: foam filled, aeronautical-style Sekur rubber bladder,

Fuel consumption 
 EPA premium gasoline
 Combined 
 City 
 Highway

Transmission

Configuration: longitudinal 6-speed manual + reverse, limited-slip differential, RWD
Gear ratios: 2.933:1 (1st), 2.157:1 (2nd), 1.681:1 (3rd), 1.360:1 (4th), 1.107:1 (5th), 0.903:1 (6th), 2.529:1 (reverse)
Final drive: 3.70:1
Final drive assembly: aluminum sand casting
Remaining gearset housing: magnesium sand casting
Support bracing: steel
Flywheel: steel
Clutch: dry, twin plate
Cooling: oil-water intercooler between gearbox lubricant and engine

Chassis
Type: central carbon fiber tub, light-alloy suspension and engine-gearbox assembly mounting points co-polymerised to the chassis
Materials: carbon fiber, epoxy resin, Nomex honeycomb structure core, sandwich construction

Suspension
Front: Rose-jointed unequal-length wishbones, push-rods, coil springs, Bilstein gas-pressurised monotube dampers, electronic adaptive damping, electronic height adjustment (40 mm max)
Rear: Rose-jointed unequal-length wishbones, push-rods, coil springs, Bilstein gas-pressurised monotube dampers, electronic adaptive damping, mounting points on a spacer between the engine and gearbox
Travel: 55 mm bump, 60 mm rebound
Camber angle: -0.7 degrees front, -1.0 degrees rear
Anti-roll bars: front and rear
Max. roll angle: 1.5 degrees

Electronic adaptive damping (based on steering wheel angle and velocity, the body's vertical and longitudinal acceleration, brake line pressure, and vehicle speed)
Maximum reaction time (from minimum to maximum damping force or vice versa): 140 milliseconds (0.14 s)
Average reaction time (from minimum to maximum damping force or vice versa): 25 to 30 milliseconds (0.025 to 0.03 s)

Steering
Type: TRW rack and pinion, 3.3 turns lock to lock, unassisted
Caster angle: 5.5 to 5.7 degrees
Turning circle:

Wheels/tires/brakes

Wheels: magnesium alloy, manufactured by Speedline
Hubs: titanium
Brake disc bells/suspension uprights/brake calipers: aluminum
Upper and lower wishbones: black powder-coated steel
Front wheels: 
Front tires: 245/35ZR-18 Goodyear Eagle F1 GS Fiorano @ 
Front brakes: Brembo cross-drilled & ventilated cast iron discs, 4 piston aluminum Brembo calipers, Pagid brake pads, (without ABS)
Rear wheels: 
Rear tires: 335/30ZR-18 Goodyear Eagle F1 GS Fiorano @ 
Rear brakes: Brembo cross-drilled & ventilated cast iron discs, 4 piston aluminum Brembo calipers, Pagid brake pads, (without ABS)
Unsprung mass: 99 lb/121 lb (front corners/rear corners)

Colour popularity 
Rosso Corsa (red): 302
Giallo Modena (yellow): 31
Rosso Barchetta (dark red): 8
Argento Nurburgring (silver): 4
Nero Daytona (black): 4

Performance

0–: 3.8 seconds
0–: 8.5 seconds
1/4 mile: 12.1 seconds at 
Skidpad: 0.95 g
Braking : 
Top speed:

Track tests 
The F50 had the following track times:
Tsukuba Circuit: 1:05.81
Suzuka Circuit (2000): 2:25.525
Sugo: 1:38.573
Fiorano: 1:27.00

References

Bibliography
 

F50
Rear mid-engine, rear-wheel-drive vehicles
Roadsters
Flagship vehicles
Cars introduced in 1995